The Morgan–Monchy Border Crossing connects the town of Loring, Montana with Val Marie, Saskatchewan on the Canada–US border. It is reached by U.S. Route 191 on the American side and Saskatchewan Highway 4 on the Canadian side.  These roadways were not paved near the border until the late 1980s. This crossing is where the proposed Keystone Pipeline was to cross the border.

In 2011, the US replaced its border inspection facilities, which were originally built in 1963.  Canada replaced its inspection facilities, which were built in 1973, in 2015.

See also
 List of Canada–United States border crossings

References

Canada–United States border crossings
Geography of Saskatchewan
1935 establishments in Montana
1935 establishments in Saskatchewan
Buildings and structures in Phillips County, Montana